The yellow prawn-goby (Cryptocentrus cinctus) is a species of goby native to the Western Pacific, where it can be found at depths of from  in coastal bays and lagoons.  This species is symbiotic with alpheid shrimps.  The species can reach a length of  SL.   These fish vary greatly in appearance, ranging from brilliant yellow to gray and even brown forms or combinations of each coloring. This species is often kept in salt water aquariums. The yellow prawn-goby can be kept in aquariums as small as 20 gallons (75 L). In the marine hobby they are often partnered with tiger pistol shrimp.

References

yellow prawn-goby
yellow prawn-goby